The Huggabug Club is an American children's television series. It first aired on PBS member stations from January 1, 1995 to June 7, 1997, then aired in reruns until July 30, 2000. It also has aired on Smile ever since the channel was launched in 2005 until it pulled from the lineup in 2016.

Cast

Adults
Audrey Landers as Miss Audrey
Judy Landers as Miss Judy

In addition to Miss Audrey and Miss Judy, the program features full-bodied puppets who magically appear with the help of a computer: Uncle Huggabug, a cowboy insect; Miss Oops-A-Daisy, a clumsy flower; and Auntie Bumble, a grandmotherly bee. The cast also includes the "Buggsters", a group of multi-cultural kids who sing and dance.

Kids

Season 1
Jamie Starr as Ernie
Alexie Agdeppa as Grace
Lindsey Landers as Kelly 
Briahnna Odom as Kim
Jessica Villareal as Maria
Christie Lee Piazza as Sally
Landon Prairie as Spencer
Kristy Landers as Tria

Season 2
Michael Minden as Alex
Alexie Agdeppa as Grace
Manner Washington as Jamie
Lindsey Landers as Kelly
Briahnna Odom as Kim
Jessica Villareal as Maria
Christie Lee Piazza as Sally
Kristy Landers as Tria

Season 3
Bryce Cotton as Bobby
Alexie Agdeppa as Grace
Valentino Moreno as Jose
Lindsey Landers as Kelly
Philip Jacobs as Leroy
Jessica Villareal as Maria
Christie Lee Piazza as Sally
Kristy Landers as Tria

Production
The series was co-created by veteran actresses and sisters Audrey and Judy Landers, as well as their manager/producer/mother Ruth Landers, who also served as executive producer. The Landers sisters co-wrote over 150 original songs for the series.

An advisory board of teachers and a child psychologist helped to guide the series towards "life skills"-teaching themes. The themes were: integrity; initiative; flexibility; perseverance; organization; sense of humor; effort; common sense; problem solving; responsibility; patience; friendship; curiosity; cooperation; and caring.

Broadcast
The show was first aired on PBS from January 1, 1995 to June 7, 1997, and aired in reruns until July 30, 2000. The show has also aired on Smile ever since the channel was launched in 2005 until it pulled from the lineup in 2016. Internationally, the series was also broadcast in South Africa, Jordan, Canada, Singapore and Zambia.

Episodes

Season 1 (1995)
 "Express Yourself": Feelings and Emotions (January 1, 1995)
 "Finders Keepers Not!": Honesty (January 8, 1995)
 "This Land is Your Land": The Environment (January 15, 1995)
 "Safety First": Safety (January 22, 1995)
 "New Kid in Town": Making New Friends (January 29, 1995)
 "Farmer Jo-Ann's Farm": Going to the Farm (February 5, 1995)
 "School Days": Everyday School Routine (February 12, 1995)
 "Fitness is Fun": Fitness Routine and Keeping Healthy (February 19, 1995)
 "Our Five Scent-Sational Senses": The 5 Senses (February 26, 1995)
 "Wheels, Wings, and Moving Things": Transportation (March 5, 1995)
 "Let's Go to the Zoo": Zoo Animals (March 12, 1995)
 "Rainy Days are Fun!": Rainy Day Activities (March 19, 1995)
 "Butcher, Baker, Candlestick Maker": Occupations (March 26, 1995)
 "Surprise Pets": Exotic Pets (April 2, 1995)
 "Remember When...": Memories (April 9, 1995)
 "Cuddly Christmas": Christmas Traditions (December 3, 1995)

Notes: 
 Kelly is absent in Episode 2.
 Kim is absent in Episode 15.
 Filmed in 1994, released in 1995.

Season 2 (1996)
 "Head to Toe": The Human Body (February 3, 1996)
 "Tell It Like It Is": Honesty (February 10, 1996)
 "And Baby Makes Four": Families and Babies (February 17, 1996)
 "Don't Be Bugged by a Bug": Bugs and Insects (February 24, 1996)
 "Dinosaurs are Dynamite!": Dinosaurs (March 2, 1996)
 "Surprises from the Sea": The Ocean and Beach Activities (March 9, 1996)
 "I'm One of a Kind": Individuality (March 16, 1996)
 "That's What Friends are For": Friendship (March 23, 1996)
 "Wacky Weather": The Weather Forecast (March 30, 1996)
 "Please Don't Tease": Respect (April 6, 1996)
 "What Do You Say?": Good Manners (April 13, 1996)
 "You Can't Win 'em All": Teamwork (April 20, 1996)
 "Let's Celebrate": Holidays (April 27, 1996)
 "Silly Scientists": Science (May 4, 1996)
 "Magical, Musical Day": Musical Instruments and Styles of Music (May 11, 1996)
 "Dance-a-Thon": Dancing (May 18, 1996)

Note: 
 Filmed in 1995, released in 1996.

Season 3 (1997)
 "A Package to Mexico": Mexico (March 1, 1997)
 "Helping Others": Helping (March 8, 1997)
 "Outer Space is Out of Sight": Outer Space (March 15, 1997)
 "Curious Kid": Being Curious and Smart (March 22, 1997)
 "We'll Always Be Family": Family Members (March 29, 1997)
 "Get Neat to the Beat": Keeping Clean (April 5, 1997)
 "USA Melting Pot": The USA and other Countries (April 12, 1997)
 "1, 2, 3 Learn Your ABC's": Letters and Numbers (April 19, 1997)
 "Willie Has Wheels": Meeting Allie's Cousin and Disability (April 26, 1997)
 "Fantastic Firefighters": Firefighters (May 3, 1997)
 "Imagine This, Imagine That": Imagination (May 10, 1997)
 "Rootin' Tootin' Reptiles": Reptiles (May 17, 1997)
 "Doctor Day": Doctors (May 24, 1997)
 "Sing Along and Learn": Singing (May 31, 1997)
 "Native Americans": Native Studies (June 7, 1997)

Notes:
 Bobby and Tria are absent in Episodes 3 and 13.
 Bobby is absent in Episodes 7 and 15.
 Filmed in 1996, released in 1997.

Accolades
The television series and videotape releases have been awarded The Parents Choice Award, The Dove Foundation Award, and The Kids First Award for quality in children's media.

References

External links
 

1990s American children's television series
2000s American children's television series
1990s American music television series
2000s American music television series
1990s preschool education television series
2000s preschool education television series
1995 American television series debuts
2000 American television series endings
American children's musical television series
American preschool education television series
American television shows featuring puppetry
Christian children's television series
English-language television shows
PBS Kids shows
PBS original programming
Television series about children
Television series about insects
American television series with live action and animation